Robert Sawina (born 27 May 1971) is a former motorcycle speedway rider from Poland.

Career 
Baron represented Poland during the 1992 Speedway World Team Cup. He also reached the 1992 Speedway Under-21 World Championship final.

He won the silver medal at the Polish Individual Speedway Championship in 2001 and twice won the silver medal in the prestigious Golden Helmet during the 1999 Polish speedway season and 2001 Polish speedway season.

After retiring he later became the team manager of KS Toruń.

Major results

World Cup 
 1992 - 8th place

References 

1971 births
Polish speedway riders
Sportspeople from Toruń
Living people